Gymnastics has been part of all World Games. Among the disciplines, there are rhythmic gymnastics, trampolining and tumbling as well as acrobatics and aerobics. Artistic gymnastics are not contested at the World Games because all of its disciplines have always been Olympic sports.

Individual rhythmic gymnastics

Women

Rope

Hoop

Ball

Clubs

Ribbon

Acrobatic gymnastics

Men

Pairs

Pairs, Balance Routine

Pairs, Tempo Routine

Groups

Groups, Balance Routine

Groups, Tempo Routine

Women

Pairs

Pairs, Balance Routine

Pairs, Tempo Routine

Groups

Groups, Balance Routine

Groups, Tempo Routine

Mixed

Pairs

Pairs, Balance Routine

Pairs, Tempo Routine

Aerobic gymnastics

Men

Individual

Women

Individual

Mixed

Pairs

Trio

Groups

Step

Dance

Trampoline

Individual
This event was discontinued when trampolining was included in the program of the Olympic Games in 2000.

Men

Women

Mini Individual

Men

Women

Synchro

Men

Women

Double-Mini Individual

Men

Women

Tumbling

Men

Women

References

External links
  Sportsacrobatics.info

 
World Games
World Games
World Games
World Games
World Games
Sports at the World Games